Jacco Eltingh and Paul Haarhuis were the defending champions but only Haarhuis competed that year with Sjeng Schalken.

Haarhuis and Schalken lost in the quarterfinals to Grant Connell and Todd Martin.

Ellis Ferreira and Jan Siemerink won in the final 2–6, 6–3, 6–2 against Jonas Björkman and Nicklas Kulti.

Seeds
The top four seeded teams received byes into the second round.

Draw

Finals

Top half

Bottom half

References
 1996 Monte Carlo Open Doubles Draw

1996 Monte Carlo Open